Awashima island may refer to:
 Awashima Island, Kagawa
 Awashima Island, Niigata, where the village of Awashimaura, Niigata is located
 Awashima Island, Shizuoka, host of the Awashima Marine Park and linked to Numazu by the Awashima Kaijō Ropeway